Walter Van Dorn "Tap" Tappan (October 8, 1890 in Carlinville, Illinois – December 19, 1967 in Lynwood, California) was a Major League Baseball infielder who played for the Kansas City Packers of the Federal League in .

References

External links

1890 births
1967 deaths
Major League Baseball infielders
Kansas City Packers players
Baseball players from Illinois
People from Carlinville, Illinois